The Kent County Council election, 2009  was an election to all 84 seats on Kent County Council held on 2 May as part of the 2009 United Kingdom local elections. 84 councillors were elected from 72 electoral divisions, which returned either one or two county councillors each by first-past-the-post voting for a four-year term of office. The electoral divisions were the same as those used at the previous election in 2005. No elections were held in Medway, which is a unitary authority outside the area covered by the County Council.

All locally registered electors (British, Irish, Commonwealth and European Union citizens) who were aged 18 or over on Thursday 4 June 2009 were entitled to vote in the local elections. Those who were temporarily away from their ordinary address (for example, away working, on holiday, in student accommodation or in hospital) were also entitled to vote in the local elections, although those who had moved abroad and registered as overseas electors cannot vote in the local elections. It is possible to register to vote at more than one address (such as a university student who had a term-time address and lives at home during holidays) at the discretion of the local Electoral Register Office, but it remains an offence to vote more than once in the same local government election.

The Conservative Party was re-elected with an increased majority and the Liberal Democrats replaced Labour as the main opposition party.

Summary of election results

Council Composition
Prior to the election the composition of the council was:

After the election the composition of the council was:

LD – Liberal Democrats
Lab – Labour Party
R – Residents Association

Results by district
Kent is divided into 12 regions: Ashford, Canterbury, Dartford, Dover, Gravesham, Maidstone, Sevenoaks, Folkestone and Hythe, Swale, Thanet, Tonbridge and Malling, and Tunbridge Wells.

Summary

Asterisks denote incumbent councillors seeking re-election.

Ashford

There are seven single-member constituencies within the borough of Ashford. Below are the results:

Canterbury

There are five single-member and two multi-member constituencies within the City of Canterbury, which elect a total of nine councilors to Kent County Council. Below are the results:

Dartford

There are six single-member constituencies within the borough of Dartford. Below are the results

Dover
There are three single-member and two multi-member constituencies within the District of Dover, which elect a total of seven councillors to Kent County Council. Below are the results:

Gravesham

There is a single-member and two multi-member constituencies within the Borough of Gravesham, which elect a total of five councillors to Kent County Council. Below are the results:

Maidstone

There are seven single-member and one multi-member constituencies within the Borough of Maidstone, which elect a total of nine councillors to Kent County Council. Below are the results:

Sevenoaks

There are seven single-member constituencies within the District of Sevenoaks which elect to Kent County Council. Below are the results:

Shepway

There are six single-member constituencies within the District of Shepway, that elect councillors to Kent County Council. The results are:

Swale

There are five single-member constituencies and one multi-member constituencies within the Borough of Swale, which elect a total of eight councillors to Kent County Council. Below are the results:

Thanet

There are two single-member and three multi-member constituencies within the District of Thanet, which elect a total of eight councillors to Kent County Council. Below are the results:

Tonbridge and Malling

There are five single-member constituencies and one multi-member constituency within the District of Tonbridge and Malling, which elect a total of seven councillors to Kent County Council. Below are the results:

Tunbridge Wells

There are six single-member constituencies within the Borough of Swale six councillors to Kent County Council. Below are the results:

References

2009 English local elections
2009
2000s in Kent